Danish Lutheran Church may refer to:

Danish Lutheran Church (Alta, Iowa), listed on the National Register of Historic Places in Buena Vista County, Iowa 
Danish Lutheran Church (Manistee, Michigan), listed on the National Register of Historic Places in Manistee County, Michigan

See also
Church of Denmark, the established, state-supported church in Denmark